Khaled Al Mamun PBGM, ndc, psc is a major general of the Bangladesh Army, currently serving as the GOC & Area Commandar of 11th Infantry division. Prior to it, he was military secretary & the Director of Military Intelligence (DMI) at Army Headquarters.

Career 
Mamun became a major general on 24 December 2020 and took the office of the Military Secretary, as the successor of Major General (later Lieutenant General) Waker-uz-zaman. Prior to his promotion, he was the Director of Military Intelligence (DMI) at the Army Headquarters, Dhaka. He is a Director of Jolshiri Abashon, a housing scheme for army officers. He served as an SSF agent when he was Colonel under Major General Sheikh Mohammad Aman Hasan as DG SSF.

References 

Living people
Bangladesh Army generals
Year of birth missing (living people)
Bangladeshi generals